Henriquezieae is a tribe of flowering plants in the family Rubiaceae and contains 20 species in 3 genera. Its representatives are found in northern South America.

Genera 
Currently accepted names

 Gleasonia Standl. (5 sp)
 Henriquezia Spruce ex Benth. (3 sp)
 Platycarpum Bonpl. (12 sp)

References 

Ixoroideae tribes
 
Taxa named by William Jackson Hooker
Taxa named by George Bentham